Littleborough Cricket Club, based in Littleborough, in the Metropolitan Borough of Rochdale, Greater Manchester, is an English cricket team currently playing in the Central Lancashire League.

The club was founded in 1839 and play on the famous Hare Hill ground.

Littleborough were founder members and inaugural champions of the Central Lancashire League, and they have been league champions on twenty occasions, the last time being in 2005.

Littleborough hold Lancashire Cricket Board Focus Club status and are ECB Clubmark accredited.  Two senior teams play in the CLL in addition to a 3rd XI who play in the North Manchester League.

The club's junior section fields teams in the CLL at U18, U15, U13, U11 and U9 age groups and the juniors receive expert coaching at the club during the summer on Monday evenings.

From start of the 2018 season Littleborough moved to the Lancashire League.

Professional players
Many notable professionals have appeared in the Littleborough side over the years, including Sir Garfield Sobers, Joel Garner, Ezra Moseley, Franklyn Stephenson, Andy Roberts, Mike Whitney, and Stuart Law.  The club's professional player engaged for 2012 is the Queensland batsman Clinton Perren. Littleborough is also the home club of the Surrey and England international Chris Schofield.

Club honours

NMCL Division 2 Champions
2015

Hodson Cup Winners
2015

CLL champions
1892, 1911, 1912, 1917, 1919, 1921, 1932, 1934, 1935, 1936, 1977, 1978, 1983, 1985, 1986, 1992, 1996, 1998, 2002, 2005

Wood Cup
1935, 1941, 1942, 1973, 1974, 1976, 1982, 1986, 1992, 1994, 1997, 1998, 1999

JW Lees Lancashire Challenge Trophy
1997, 2005

2nd XI champions
1910, 1920, 1928, 1936, 1973, 1988, 1989, 1991, 2005

Burton Cup
1985, 1990, 2002, 2003, 2004, 2005, 2006, 2007, 2011

Aggregate Cup
1932, 1935, 1936, 1977, 1985, 1988, 1989, 1990, 1992, 1996, 1998, 2002, 2004, 2005

Whittaker Cup
2006, 2007,

Taylor Cup
1996, 1997, 2006, 2007, 2016

References

Sport in the Metropolitan Borough of Rochdale
Central Lancashire League cricket clubs
Cricket clubs established in 1839
1839 establishments in England
Cricket in Greater Manchester
Lancashire League cricket clubs
Littleborough, Greater Manchester
Organisations based in Rochdale Borough